Edyta Geppert (born 27 November 1953 in Nowa Ruda, Poland) is a popular Polish singer.

Geppert was born to a Polish father and Hungarian mother. She is married to Piotr Loretz. They have one son Mieczysław (born in 1988).

Awards
1984 – Grand Prix at the National Festival of Polish Song in Opole for the song Jaka róża, taki cierń
1986 – Grand Prix at the National Festival of Polish Song in Opole for the song Och, życie, kocham cię nad życie
1995 – Grand Prix at the National Festival of Polish Song in Opole for the song Idź swoją drogą

Discography

Studio albums

Live albums

References

External links
 Official Website of Edyta Geppert

1953 births
Living people
People from Nowa Ruda
Polish people of Hungarian descent
Knights of the Order of Polonia Restituta
Recipients of the Silver Medal for Merit to Culture – Gloria Artis
Polish women singers
Polish jazz singers